Augustine Francis Schinner (May 1, 1863 – February 7, 1937) was an American prelate of the Roman Catholic Church.  He served as the first bishop of the Diocese of Superior in Wisconsin from 1905 to 1913 and as the first bishop of the Diocese of Spokane in Washington State from 1914 to 1925.

Biography

Early years in Milwaukee 
Augustine Schinner was born in Milwaukee, Wisconsin, on May 1, 1863.  He was educated at St. Francis Seminary in Wisconsin.

Schinner was ordained to the priesthood for the Archdiocese of Milwaukee on March 7, 1886, by Archbishop Michael Heiss at the Cathedral of St. John the Evangelist. After his ordination, Schinner served for one year as pastor of St. Hubertus Parish in Hubertus, Wisconsin.

From 1887 to 1893, Schinner was a faculty member of St. Francis Seminary. From 1893 to 1905, her served as chancellor and vicar general of the archdiocese, appointed by Archbishop Frederick Katzer.

Bishop of Superior 
On May 13, 1905, Pope Pius X appointed Schinner as the first bishop of the newly created Diocese of Superior. He was consecrated by Cardinal Diomede Falconio on July 25, 1905.

Traveling by train with an entourage of over 60 priests from Milwaukee, he arrived at Ashland, Wisconsin, traveled to the Apostle Islands on a short boat tour, and then continued on to Superior.

There were 39 diocesan priests, 17 religious order priests serving 38,861 Catholics in 43 parishes with resident pastors, and 50 missions and 33 stations. For Catholic schools, there was 1 high school, 16 elementary and 2 boarding schools with a total enrollment of 9,016 students. Schinner immediately saw the need for an additional 10 priests.

As a missionary bishop, he learned first hand the difficulties of travel into remote rural counties. He took an interest in evangelizing among the nearly 4,000 Catholic Native Americans.

On February 7, 1913, Pope Benedict XV accepted Schinner's resignation as bishop of the Diocese of Superior.

Bishop of Spokane 

On March 18, 1914, Schinner was appointed first bishop of the new Diocese of Spokane by Pope Benedict XV. Schinner was installed on April 18, 1914.

Retirement and legacy 
On December 17, 1925, Pope Pius XI accepted Schinner's resignation as bishop of the Diocese of Spokane.  After his resignation, Schinner served as a missionary in Bolivia until 1928. After returning to Milwaukee, he spent the rest of his life serving as chaplain for the Sisters of the Divine Savior in Milwaukee.

Augustine Schinner died of pneumonia at St. Mary's Hospital on February 7, 1937, at age 73.  He was buried in Holy Cross Cemetery in Milwaukee.

See also 

 Catholic Church hierarchy
 Catholic Church in the United States
 Historical list of the Catholic bishops of the United States
 List of Catholic bishops of the United States
 Lists of patriarchs, archbishops, and bishops

References

External links 
Roman Catholic Diocese of Spokane
Roman Catholic Diocese of Superior
Superior’s Bishop Schinner resigns

1863 births
1937 deaths
People from Milwaukee County, Wisconsin
People from Douglas County, Wisconsin
Religious leaders from Milwaukee
20th-century Roman Catholic bishops in the United States
Roman Catholic bishops of Spokane
Roman Catholic bishops of Superior
Roman Catholic Archdiocese of Milwaukee
St. Francis Seminary (Wisconsin) alumni